This was the first edition of the tournament.

Mihaela Buzărnescu won the title, defeating Anna Bondár in the final, 6–1, 6–3.

Seeds

Draw

Finals

Top half

Bottom half

References

Main Draw

ITF Féminin Le Neubourg - Singles